The first series of Junior Bake Off aired from 31 October 2011, with thirty-two contestants competing to be crowned the series 1 winner. Aaron Craze presented the show, and Paul Hollywood and Mary Berry judged.

Contestants
 Semi-Finalist 
 Finalist 
 Winner

Episodes

Episode 1

Episode 2

Episode 3

Episode 4

Episode 5

Episode 6

Episode 7

Episode 8

Episode 9

Episode 10

Finals

Episode 11
The four finalists are first given a masterclass; in the masterclass they learn how to decorate shortbread and cupcakes to a professional standard. They are then split into two teams; they must prepare afternoon tea for judges Mary, Paul and Michelin-starred chef Michel Roux Junior.
Kai and Freya is one team, Saffron and Kieran is the other.

Episode 12
In this episode the four finalists are put on the spot with a knowledge test, a series of difficult questions and practical challenges. They are split into two teams where they must work together to bake for a glamorous event; the fifth anniversary party for London's West End musical Wicked.

Episode 13: Grand Final
The finalists must bake two of their own recipes for judges Mary Berry and Paul Hollywood and a party of invited friends and family.

Ratings
All viewing figures are from BARB.

References

External links
 

The Great British Bake Off
2011 British television seasons